Opsibidion is a genus of beetles in the family Cerambycidae, containing the following species:

 Opsibidion albifasciatum Giesbert, 1998
 Opsibidion albinum (Bates, 1870)
 Opsibidion flavocinctum Martins, 1960

References

Ibidionini